The Arlington Hotel  also known as the Echo Tavern and the Echo Hotel, Restaurant and Lounge is a historic building in Echo, Oregon.

Description and history
The -story wood-frame building is of vernacular construction. The  main mass of the building has a rectangular plan with a gable roof and simple details. There have been two additions to the structure one historic and another recent. It originally operated as saloon and hotel. Originally called the Louvre Saloon rooms included "sample rooms" for salesmen to display their goods. An undertaker used the top floor who left behind coffins that were found decades later. The hotel also operated under the name Arlington House.

Built between 1882 and 1886 by James H. Koontz, founder of Echo, the Arlington Hotel is one of the oldest extant buildings in town and one of the few large historic wood-frame buildings that remain in Umatilla County. The time of the construction coincides with the primary period of development for the Echo. Koontz moved there in 1880 and filed the first plat for Echo that year with W.D. Brassfield. In 1884 there were 15 businesses in town. Koontz, a merchant, had moved to the location anticipating the shift from river to rail transport. 

The property was added to the National Register of Historic Places on August 28, 1997. In 2008 Echo Saloon LLC held a liquor license for the Echo Saloon.

See also
 History of Oregon
 History of rail transportation in the United States
 National Register of Historic Places listings in Umatilla County, Oregon
 Oregon country

References

External links 

 *  - features a slide show of historic buildings in Echo
  - contextual resources, a period map etc.
  - repository for information on this property used in the NRHP applications

Hotel buildings on the National Register of Historic Places in Oregon
Buildings and structures in Umatilla County, Oregon
Hotel buildings completed in 1882
National Register of Historic Places in Umatilla County, Oregon
1882 establishments in Oregon
Echo, Oregon